Nora Stapleton is a former Ireland women's rugby union international. Stapleton represented Ireland at the 2010, 2014 and 2017 Women's Rugby World Cups. She was also a member of the Ireland teams that won the 2013 and 2015 Women's Six Nations Championships. Stapleton has also played two other football codes at a senior level. As a women's association football player, she played for UCD in FAI Women's Cup finals and UEFA Women's Cup campaigns.

Early years and education
Stapleton grew up in Fahan, near Buncrana, in Inishowen, County Donegal. She was educated at St Mura's NS in Tooban and Crana College in Buncrana.  Between 2001 and 2004 Stapleton attended University College Dublin where she gained a BSc. She studied sports management, financial management, leisure management, theory of coaching, physiology and organisational management.

Association football
Stapleton attended UCD on a soccer scholarship and played as a defender for the women's football team. Together with Sylvia Gee, Mary Waldron and Caroline Thorpe, she was a prominent member of the UCD team that won three successive FAI Women's Cup finals between 2002 and 2004. After winning the FAI Women's Cup, UCD qualified for the UEFA Women's Cup and Stapleton subsequently played in their 2003–04, 2004–05 and 2005–06 campaigns. She also helped UCD complete a four-in-a-row of Dublin Women's Soccer League titles between 2003 and 2006.

Ladies' Gaelic football

Clubs
Stapleton played ladies' Gaelic football at club level for Naomh Padraig, UCD and Na Fianna.

Inter-County
In June 2008 she was named Player of the Month after helping Donegal defeat , the reigning champions, in the first round of the Ulster Senior Ladies' Football Championship. On 26 September 2010, Stapleton helped Donegal win the 2010 All-Ireland Intermediate Ladies' Football Championship. In the final Donegal played a  team that included Stapleton's Ireland women's rugby union international teammate, Niamh Briggs.
Between 2007 and 2013 Stapleton also worked for Ballinteer St John's GAA/Dublin GAA as a Gaelic games promotional officer.

Rugby union

Old Belvedere
Stapleton did not start playing women's rugby union until she was 24. She was working for the Bank of Ireland in Dublin in 2007 when she was invited to play in a tag rugby social event. This subsequently led to an invitation to try out for Old Belvedere. Stapleton was a member of Old Belvedere women's team that won three consecutive All Ireland Division One titles between 2013 and 2015. Stapleton captained the team in the 2015 final and scored nine points, a try and two conversations, as Old Belvedere defeated UL Bohemians 19–17 at Donnybrook Stadium.

Leinster
Stapleton has played for Leinster in the IRFU Women's Interprovincial Series. She was first called up to the Leinster squad in 2009.

Barbarians
On 10 November 2017 Stapleton came on as a replacement for the Barbarians against Munster in the invitational team's first women's match. Stapleton provided the assist for Georgina Roberts to score the crucial third try as the Barbarians won 19–0. 
In March 2018 Stapleton also played for the Barbarians against a British Army XV.

Ireland international
Between 2010 and 2017 Stapleton made 50 appearances for Ireland. She made her debut for Ireland against Italy on 5 February 2010. Stapleton represented Ireland at the 2010, 2014 and 2017 Women's Rugby World Cups. At the 2014 tournament she was a member of the Ireland team that defeated New Zealand. She was also a member of the Ireland teams that won the 2013 and 2015 Women's Six Nations Championships. During the 2013 championship Stapleton was a member of the first Ireland team to defeat England. On 26 August 2017 Stapleton made her 50th and final appearance for Ireland against Wales during 2017 Women's Rugby World Cup. Since 2013 Stapleton has also worked for the IRFU as a women and girls development manager.

Honours

Rugby union
Ireland
Women's Six Nations Championship
Winners: 2013, 2015: 2
Grand Slam
Winners: 2013
Triple Crown
Winners: 2013, 2015
Leinster
IRFU Women's Interprovincial Series
Winners: 2013, 2016: 2
Old Belvedere
All Ireland Division One
Winners: 2013, 2014, 2015 : 3
Individual 
Women's All Ireland Player’s Player of the Year Award
 2018

Association football
UCD
FAI Women's Cup
Winners: 2002, 2003, 2004 : 3
Dublin Women's Soccer League
Winners: 2003, 2004, 2005, 2006: 4
DWSL Premier Cup
Winners: 2004, 2005, 2007: 3

Gaelic football

All-Ireland Intermediate Ladies' Football Championship
Winner: 2010
Individual 
Ladies Player of the Month Award
 June 2008

References

1983 births
Living people
Ireland women's international rugby union players
Irish female rugby union players
Rugby union players from County Donegal
Leinster Rugby women's players
Old Belvedere R.F.C. players
Barbarian F.C. players
Donegal inter-county ladies' footballers
Ladies' Gaelic footballers who switched code
UCD Gaelic footballers
Association footballers from County Donegal
Dublin Women's Soccer League players
Republic of Ireland women's association footballers
UCD Women's Soccer Club players
Alumni of University College Dublin
Women's association football midfielders